"Kiss Me Red" is a song written by the songwriting duo of Billy Steinberg and Tom Kelly, and first released in 1984 for the soundtrack of the short-lived TV series Dreams, where it was performed on the show by the fictional title band. The song was notably covered by Cheap Trick in 1986 on their ninth album The Doctor, and by ELO Part II in 1990 for their album Electric Light Orchestra Part Two.

Dreams version

Background
In 1984, the song was released as the theme song to the short-lived TV series Dreams, a CBS television series that aired in 1984 for one season. The show follows the story of a fictional rock band that tries to get a recording contract. "Kiss Me Red" was released as a single in the US and also featured on the series soundtrack album.  The six-member fictional band, featuring the American actors John Stamos, Jami Gertz, Albert Macklin and Cain Devore, performed the song during the series as well.

Upon release, Billboard listed "Kiss Me Red" as a recommended pop pick and described it as a "techno-dance song". On the soundtrack album, Dreams also performed the song "Alone", also written by Steinberg and Kelly, which would become a hit in 1987 for the American rock band Heart.

Personnel
Dreams
 John Stamos - guitar
 Jami Gertz - bass guitar
 Albert Macklin - keyboards
 Valerie Stevenson - vocals
 Lisa Copley - vocals
 Cain Devore - drums

Additional personnel
 Bruce Botnick - producer

Cheap Trick version

"Kiss Me Red" was covered by the American rock band Cheap Trick, for their ninth studio album The Doctor and was released as a European single in 1986. The single was released as a 7-inch single in Europe, while a promotional 12-inch single was issued in the US, featuring the song on both sides of the vinyl.  The B-side on the 7-inch vinyl was "Name of the Game", which was taken from The Doctor. Originally, Epic Records had Cheap Trick record "Kiss Me Red" as they believed it would be a potential hit single for the band. It was set to be released as the leading US single from The Doctor, but was replaced by "It's Only Love".

Promotion
Unlike "It's Only Love", no music video was filmed to promote the single, but the band did perform the song live on the American TV show The Rock 'n' Roll Evening News, along with the tracks "It's Only Love" and "I Want You to Want Me". Upon release, adverts for The Doctor album highlighted "Kiss Me Red" as a stand-out track.

Track listing
7-inch single
"Kiss Me Red" - 3:34
"Name of the Game" - 4:16

12-inch single (US promo)
"Kiss Me Red" - 3:34
"Kiss Me Red" - 3:34

Personnel
Cheap Trick
 Robin Zander - lead vocals, rhythm guitar
 Rick Nielsen - lead guitar, backing vocals
 Jon Brant - bass, backing vocals
 Bun E. Carlos - drums, percussion

Additional personnel
 Tony Platt - producer, mixing
 Paul Klingberg - mixing

ELO Part II version

In 1990, ELO Part II recorded an orchestrated version of the song for their debut studio album Electric Light Orchestra Part Two. It was produced by Jeff Glixman. The song had been performed live by the group, with the song being performed and professionally filmed live in Moscow during 1991.

In a review of the album, Doug Stone of AllMusic commented: "Out of the blue, ELO II even takes a crack at "Kiss Me Red," a roguish non-hit composed by the authors of "Like a Virgin" that Cheap Trick attempted on the wire-crossing Doctor." In his review of the albums reissue, Part Two: Once Upon A Time, Thom Jurek of AllMusic commented: "Cluing you into the desperation here, there's a rather strange, surprise cover here of 'Kiss Me Red'".

Personnel
ELO Part II
 Neil Lockwood - lead vocals
 Eric Troyer - keyboards, backing vocals
 Peter Haycock - guitars, bass, backing vocals
 Bev Bevan - drums, percussion, backing vocals

Additional personnel
 Jeff Glixman - producer
 Don Arden - executive producer
 Mark Derryberry, Jonathan Miller - engineers
 Bob Norberg, Kevin Reeves - editing
 Wally Traugott - mastering
 Louis Clark - string arrangements

References

Songs about kissing
1986 singles
Cheap Trick songs
Songs written by Tom Kelly (musician)
Songs written by Billy Steinberg
Song recordings produced by Jeff Glixman
1984 songs
Epic Records singles
Song recordings produced by Tony Platt